División de Honor B is the second level of Spanish league competition for rugby union clubs. The league began in 1998 and consists of three groups (North, East and South) of 8 or 9 teams each. The two top teams of each group and two best 3rd-placed teams qualify for promotion playoff.

Competition

Format
The season takes place between October and April. There are three groups of 12 teams, with every team playing each other home and away for a total of 22 matches. Points are awarded according to the following:
4 points for a win
2 points for a draw
1 bonus point is awarded to a team scoring 4 tries or more in a match
1 bonus point is awarded to a team that loses a match by 7 points or fewer

Promotion playoffs
For the promotion playoff, the teams are seeded by total points. The draw for the promotion playoff is as follows:

2015–16 season teams

Group A

Teams from northern part of Spain

Group B

Teams from eastern part of Spain

Group C

Teams from southern part of Spain

2014–15 season

Champions by season

See also
 División de Honor de Rugby
 Rugby union in Spain

References

External links
 Spanish Rugby Federation

 
3
Spain
1998 establishments in Spain
Sports leagues established in 1998